WDEH (800 AM, "Spirit of the Volunteer Valley") is a radio station broadcasting a religious format. Licensed to Sweetwater, Tennessee, United States, the station is currently owned by Horne Radio, LLC.

References

External links

Monroe County, Tennessee
DEH